Kilvelur is a panchayat town in kilvelur taluk in the district of Nagapattinam district in the Indian state of Tamil Nadu.

Famous Towns nearby
It is 12 km east of Tiruvarur, 12 km west of Nagapattinam and 6 km west of Sikkal, a famous Murugan shrine. Nagapattinam , Thiruvarur , Karaikal , Thiruthuraipoondi are the nearby Cities to kilvelur

Literacy
Literacy rate of Kilvelur city is 89.82 % higher than state average of 80.09 %. In Kilvelur, Male literacy is around 94.33 % while female literacy rate is 85.60 %.

Demographics
Female Sex Ratio is of 1058 against state average of 996. Moreover Child Sex Ratio in Kilvelur is around 938 compared to Tamil Nadu state average of 943.

Population
 India census, Kilvelur had a population of 8,272 of which 4,020 are males while 4,252 are females as per report released by Census India 2011. in Kilvelur Town Panchayat

References

Cities and towns in Nagapattinam district